Xenachoffatia is a small Jurassic mammal from Portugal. It was a relatively early member of the also extinct order of Multituberculata. It lived during "the age of the dinosaurs" and belongs to the suborder Plagiaulacida, family Paulchoffatiidae.

The genus Xenachoffatia ("for Xena Choffat") was named by Hahn G. and Hahn R. in 1998. The primary species Xenachoffatia oinopion (Hahn & Hahn, 1998) was found in Kimmeridgian (Upper Jurassic) Camadas de Guimarota of Guimarota, Portugal. The classification is based on three upper molars.

References 
 Hahn & Hahn (1998), "Neue Beobachtungen an Plagiaulacoidea (Multituberculata) des Ober-Juras. 3. Der Bau der Molaren bei den Paulchoffatiidae." (New observations on the skull and jaw constructions in Paulchoffatiidae Multituberculata, Upper Jurassic.) Berliner Geowissenschaftlich Abhandlungen, E, 28, p. 39-84.
 Hahn, G. & Hahn, R. (2000), "Multituberculates from the Guimarota mine", p. 97-107 in Martin T & Krebs B (eds), Guimarota - A Jurassic Ecosystem, Verlag Dr. Friedrich Pfeil, München.
 Kielan-Jaworowska, Z. & Hurum, J.H. (2001), "Phylogeny and Systematics of multituberculate mammals", Paleontology 44, p. 389-429.
 Much of this information has been derived from  Multituberculata Cope, 1884. 
 With thanks to David Marjanovic for additional info.

Multituberculates
Late Jurassic mammals of Europe
Fossils of Portugal
Prehistoric mammal genera